Reconstructions is the second studio album by the Christian rock group AD. It was re-released and remastered with the title Reconstructions: Reconstructed, with a different order of songs.

Background

Warren Ham left AD after the end of the Art of the State Tour in 1985. As a result, he was not featured on the second album released by the band. Michael Gleason, who has worked with Livgren and the others in the past, replaces Ham on lead vocals on Reconstructions. Times were financially harder for the band following the release of Art of the State and with Ham's recent departure, the group decided that Reconstructions would be AD's final album as a group. The band's official breakup was never announced, as the group has dissipated from the inability to keep up with the lack of support.

Reception 
AllMusic gave the album a decent rating of three out of five, calling Reconstructions "A very strong record with excellent arrangements and excellent songwriting", yet recalling how many of the songs suffer in sound quality due to Kerry's inexperience as a strong worker in the field of sound engineering. Kerrang! rock music magazine gave the band's release a good rating of four out of five.

Track listing

Personnel 
A.D.
 Michael Gleason – lead vocals, backing vocals, keyboards
 Kerry Livgren – keyboards, guitars, percussion
 Dave Hope – bass
 Dennis Holt – percussion

Additional vocals
 Terry Brock – backing vocals (2, 4, 5, 6, 8, 9)
 Keith Evans – backing vocals (7)

Production
 Kerry Livgren – producer, engineer 
 Steve Hall – mastering at Future Disc (Hollywood, California)
 Jean Hoefel – art direction 
 Jim Shanman – jacket design

References

Sparrow Records albums
1987 albums
AD (band) albums